William McKinley, the 25th President of the United States, successfully ran for president twice:

 William McKinley presidential campaign, 1896
 William McKinley presidential campaign, 1900, the successful reelection campaign William McKinley conducted in 1900